Endotricha wammeralis is a species of snout moth in the genus Endotricha. It was described by Arnold Pagenstecher in 1886, and is known from Aru.

References

Endotrichini
Moths described in 1886